is a passenger railway station in the city of Naka, Ibaraki, Japan operated by East Japan Railway Company (JR East).

Lines
Urizura Station is served by the Suigun Line, and is located 16.7 rail kilometers from the official starting point of the line at Mito Station.

Station layout
The station consists of a single island platform. The station building is elevated and located on a cantilever pedestrian overpass connecting the platform with the road. The station is staffed.

Platforms

History
Urizura Station opened on June 12, 1918 as a station on the Mito Railway which was nationalized on December 1, 1927. The station was absorbed into the JR East network upon the privatization of the Japanese National Railways (JNR) on April 1, 1987.

Passenger statistics
In fiscal 2019, the station was used by an average of 261 passengers daily (boarding passengers only).

Surrounding area

former Urizura Town Hall
 Urizura Post Office

See also
List of railway stations in Japan

References

External links

  JR East Station information 

Railway stations in Ibaraki Prefecture
Suigun Line
Railway stations in Japan opened in 1918
Naka, Ibaraki